Kashmiri may refer to:
 People or things related to the Kashmir Valley or the broader region of Kashmir
 Kashmiris, an ethnic group native to the Kashmir Valley
 Kashmiri language, their language

People with the name 
 Kashmiri Saikia Baruah, Indian actress
 Abid Kashmiri, Pakistani actor and a comedian
 Agha Hashar Kashmiri (1879–1935), Urdu poet, playwright and dramatist
 Agha Shorish Kashmiri (1917–1975), Pakistani scholar and politician
 Amr Kashmiri (born 1987), Pakistani actor and musician
 Anwar Shah Kashmiri (1875–1933), Kashmiri Islamic scholar from former British India
 Aziz Kashmiri (born 1919), Kashmiri journalist
 Hamidi Kashmiri (born 1932), Indian poet and academic
 Ilyas Kashmiri (1964–2011), senior al-Qaeda operative
 Shahzad Kashmiri, Pakistani television and film director and cinematographer
 Kashmiri Lal Zakir (1919–2016), Indian writer
 MC Kash (born 1990), Kashmiri Rapper

See also 
 Kashmir (disambiguation)
 Kashmiri Muslims
 Kashmiri Pandit, a Hindu community
 Kashmiri cuisine
 Kashmiri culture 
 Kashmiri literature
 Kashmiri proverbs
 Kashmiri Gate (disambiguation)
 "Kashmiri Song", a 1902 song by Amy Woodforde-Finden based on a poem by Laurence Hope
 Keshmiri
 Cashmere (disambiguation)

Language and nationality disambiguation pages